Elliot Smith (born August 14, 1967) is a former American football defensive back. He played for the San Diego Chargers in 1989, the Denver Broncos in 1990 and for the Montreal Machine in 1992.

References

1967 births
Living people
American football defensive backs
Alcorn State Braves football players
San Diego Chargers players
Denver Broncos players
Montreal Machine players